Megaraptor is a genus of large theropod dinosaur that lived in the ages of the Late Cretaceous. Its fossils have been discovered in the Patagonian Portezuelo Formation of Argentina, South America. Initially thought to have been a giant dromaeosaur-like coelurosaur, it was classified as a neovenatorid allosauroid in previous phylogenies, but more recent phylogeny and discoveries of related megaraptoran genera has placed it as either a basal tyrannosauroid or a basal coelurosaur with some studies still considering it a neovenatorid.

Description

Megaraptor was initially described as a giant dromaeosaur, known primarily from a single claw (about 30 cm long) that resembled the sickle-shaped foot claw of dromaeosaurids. The discovery of a complete front limb, however, showed that this giant claw actually came from the first finger of the hand. The hands were unusually elongated, bearing sickle-shaped claws even more recurved than those of spinosaurids.

Classification
The hand is quite distinct from other basal tetanurans, so it was not initially clear whether Megaraptor was an allosaurid, a carcharodontosaurid, a spinosauroid, or something else entirely. Subsequent studies, as well as the identification of close relatives with similar large claws on the forelimbs (see below), helped identify Megaraptor as a highly advanced and lightly built allosauroid, and a member of the family Neovenatoridae. More recent studies have proposed that Megaraptor and its kin are actually tyrannosauroids or spinosauroids as opposed to allosauroids. A juvenile specimen described in 2014 has provided more evidence towards Megaraptor being a primitive tyrannosauroid. The discovery of Gualicho indicates that Megaraptor may not be a tyrannosauroid, but either an allosauroid or basal coelurosaur.

When first discovered and prior to publication, the spinosaurid Baryonyx was also reported to be a dromaeosaurid, and the allosauroid Chilantaisaurus was reported to be a possible spinosaurid, both based on the large hand claws.

The cladogram shown below follows an analysis by Porfiri et al., 2014.

In the 2022 description of Maip, Rolando et al. noted the presence of two distinct megaraptoran clades: a more inclusive clade, comprising all megaraptorids except Fukuiraptor and Australovenator, (shown below as "Clade A"), and a more exclusive clade of larger, entirely South American megaraptorids (shown below as "Clade B"). Like some previous analyses by other authors, Megaraptora is nested within Coelurosauria, as the sister taxon to Tyrannosauroidea. The cladogram below displays the megaraptoran results of the phylogenetic analyses by Rolando et al (2022).

Paleoecology 

Megaraptor is known from the Late Turonian to Early Coniacian-dated Portezuelo Formation of Argentina. Other named dinosaurs known from the formation include the titanosaurian sauropods Futalognkosaurus, Baalsaurus, and Malarguesaurus, and several other theropod taxa including the dromaeosaurids Neuquenraptor, Unenlagia, and Pamparaptor, the alvarezsaurid Patagonykus, and the abelisaurid Elemgasem. Indeterminate remains belonging to an unnamed megaraptorid, a possible noasaurid, and ornithopods have also been recovered from the formation. Fossils of teleost fish (Leufuichthys), turtles (Portezueloemys and a species of Prochelidella), birds, and pterosaurs (Argentinadraco) are also known.

References

External links 
 Science Daily

Megaraptorans
Coniacian life
Turonian life
Late Cretaceous dinosaurs of South America
Cretaceous Argentina
Fossils of Argentina
Portezuelo Formation
Fossil taxa described in 1998
Taxa named by Fernando Novas